Rei Davi (English: King David) is a Brazilian miniseries produced and broadcast by RecordTV. It premiered on January 12, 2012 and ended on May 3, 2012. The series is based on the Books of Samuel and a part of I Kings.

Synopsis
The plot is based on I Samuel and II Samuel. It shows the life of David, a shepherd son of Jesse, who is very much envied by others. Saul, his main enemy, wants to kill him. Saul is slain in battle and David assumes the throne of Israel, but even so he will have enemies and many other things will happen to him. After several battles Saul surrenders to David his daughter Michal to become his wife in which he was always envious of David's other wives because of his infertility. After the death of Saul and Jonathan his son Etbaal takes over the throne of Israel while David reigns over the tribe of Judah. After the death of Etbaal, David becomes the king of Israel and makes the capital Jerusalem.

Cast

Production
The series  had scenes filmed in stockshot in the Desert of Chile and in cities of Canada, like Cache Creek and Kamloops. There were scenes in Rio Grande and in other cities outside of São Paulo, like Diamantina, in Minas Gerais.

Some actors had to learn Hebrew and how to make bread, besides customs of the time of the Bible and tactics of war. The series cost R$25,000,000.

Broadcast
The series was broadcast on Tuesdays and Thursday from January 24, 2012 to May 3, 2012. It was rerun from October 22, 2012 to December 17, 2012 and again from November 16, 2015 to January 18, 2016.

In the United States it aired on MundoMax in 2013. It also aired on Univision from December 11, 2017 to January 12, 2018 at 8pm/7c.

References

External links 
  
 

2012 telenovelas
Brazilian telenovelas
RecordTV miniseries
Portuguese-language telenovelas
2012 Brazilian television series debuts
2012 Brazilian television series endings
Brazilian television miniseries
Period television series
Television series based on the Bible